Velistsikhe  is a village in Georgia. It is located in the Gurjaani Municipality of Kakheti. In 2014, its population was 4,508.

See also
 Kakheti

See also
 Census of village population of Georgia (PDF)

References

Populated places in Gurjaani Municipality
Tiflis Governorate